2000–01 Trabzonspor season

Trabzonspor played its 26th consecutive season in 1. Lig.

Season summary 

Trabzonspor finished 5th the 2000-01 season. Trabzonspor was included the Turkish Cup from 3rd round. Galatasaray defeated Trabzonspor 4 - 1 in Trabzon in quarter finals. Trabzonspor could not qualify to play in any European cup games for the 2000-01 season.

Squad

Transfers

In

Out

League table

Scorers

Hat-tricks

1. lig games

1st half

2nd half

Turkish Cup

European cup games 

Trabzonspor couldn't qualify to play in any European cup games in 2000-01 season.

See also 
 Trabzonspor
 2000–01 1.Lig

Notes

Sources 
 Turkish Football Federation 
 Trabzonspor Official Site
 MAÇKOLİK

Trabzonspor seasons
Turkish football clubs 2000–01 season